Sir John Bowyer, 1st Baronet (21 September 1623 – 18 July 1666) was a 17th-century English soldier and politician.

Bowyer was the son of Sir William Bowyer, a wealthy Staffordshire landowner of Knypersley Hall, near Biddulph and his wife Hester Skeffington. 

Bowyer was a Colonel in the Parliamentary army during the English Civil War and fought at the Battle of Hopton Heath and was involved in the destruction of Eccleshall Castle. He was elected Member of Parliament for Staffordshire in 1646 to the Long Parliament. He was excluded from the House of Commons under Pride's Purge on 6 December 1646. He was elected as MP for Newcastle-under-Lyme in 1656 in the Second Protectorate Parliament, but never sat. In 1660 he was re-elected MP for Newcastle-under-Lyme for the Convention Parliament and sat until 1661.

On the Restoration, as Colonel of the Staffordshire Militia, he arrested Maj-Gen Thomas Harrison as one of the  Regicides of Charles I. Bowyer was created a baronet by Charles II on 11 September 1660. He was High Sheriff of Staffordshire in 1662.

He married firstly in 1648 Mary Milward, daughter of Robert Milward of Bradlow Ash Derbyshire. He married secondly in 1665 Elizabeth Egerton, daughter of Sir Ralph Egerton of Betley Staffordshire.

References

1623 births
1666 deaths
Baronets in the Baronetage of England
Cavaliers
High Sheriffs of Staffordshire
17th-century soldiers
English MPs 1640–1648
English MPs 1656–1658
English MPs 1660
Members of the Parliament of England for Newcastle-under-Lyme
Staffordshire Militia officers